Mixed state may refer to:

 Mixed affective state, simultaneous depression and mania
 Mixed quantum state, a concept in quantum mechanics
 Mixed government, a hybrid form of government